Lakeside Village is an unincorporated community in central Jefferson County, Kansas, United States.  It is located on the shore of Perry Lake.

The community has a "town hall" despite being unincorporated; it also has a community swimming pool.  Lakeside Village uses Ozawkie as its mailing address, and Oskaloosa USD 341 serves area students.

History
Properties in the community were first sold in the 1960s while Perry Lake was under construction. The lake was completed in 1970, and Jefferson County designated Lakeside Village as an improvement district in 1972.

See also
 Perry State Park

References

Further reading

External links
 Jefferson County maps: Current, Historic, KDOT

Unincorporated communities in Jefferson County, Kansas
Unincorporated communities in Kansas